Lisa Gleave (born November 11, 1976) is an Australian-American glamour model and TV personality, known for her work as a Barker's Beauty on The Price Is Right and her appearances on the show Deal or No Deal.

Early life
Born in Queensland, Australia, Gleave moved to the United States in 2000 to pursue her dream in modeling and fashion.

Career
During 2005–2009, she was a model on the game show Deal or No Deal, where she always held the number 3 briefcase.  She has also had roles in Accepted and CSI: NY.  She is an E3 booth babe for Tecmo.  Gleave is the cover model for the 2006 Maxim calendar and has been featured in Maxim and FHM at least 5 times in 3 different continents over the last 5 years.

Gleave is also the spokesperson for the travel website IC Places.

Filmography

Films
One With The Gun Paintball Training (2007) – Splat girl
Accepted (2006) – Kiki's Best Friend #1
Bald  (2008) – Shirtless Cynthia
Deep In The Valley (2009) – Officer Britney Speared
Date Night  (2010)
Night Of The Templar (2010) – Ashley

Television shows
Take Down (1979) – Mingo Junction Cheerleader
The Price Is Right (2002–2003) – Model
Spike Video Game Awards  (2003) – Trophy PresenterReno 911!  (2005) – TammyCSI: NY (2006) – Jennifer FazottiDeal or No Deal (2005–2009) – Model #3Super Dave's Spike Tacular  (2009) – Beautiful Girl
Tosh.0 (2010) – Bachelorette for the weekly web redemption.

Magazine covers21 Magazine''  (Fall 2006) – Jr. Cover Model

References

External links
Lisa Gleave Official Website

1976 births
Living people
Australian female models
American female models
Game show models
Actresses from the Gold Coast, Queensland
21st-century American women